The Valle Spluga, also known as the Val San Giacomo and as the Val dei Giüst, is an Alpine valley in the north Italian Province of Sondrio (Lombardy), which extends from the Splügen Pass, on the border with Switzerland, south to Chiavenna. It is the valley of the river Liro.

 
Valleys of the Alps
Valleys of Lombardy